Operation Regenbogen (Operation Rainbow) was a sortie in 1942 into the Arctic Ocean by warships of the Nazi Germany  (German navy) during the Second World War. The operation culminated in the Battle of the Barents Sea.

Background
Following the hard-fought PQ 18 and the disastrous PQ 17 battles in the autumn and summer of 1942 the Allied supply convoys to the Soviet Union had been temporarily suspended. In December 1942 they started again with a new JW/RA convoy series.

German plan
 was based on a plan to intercept the next Allied convoy to Murmansk. A patrol line of four U-boats was established off Bear Island and a surface force consisting of cruisers Hipper, Lützow and six destroyers was assembled at Altafjord. In the event of a convoy report the fleet would sail as two battle-groups; one to engage the expected cruiser escort and the other to attack the convoy. The German force was handicapped by strict orders from Adolf Hitler not to take excessive risks with the capital ships, which led to a general loss of aggression.  was also hampered by an additional aim of sending Lützow on into the Atlantic following the action, which also led to a reluctance to take risks.

Action
In the Battle of the Barents Sea, Regenbogen had some success; Hipper was able to draw off the escort as planned, allowing Lützow to close with the convoy. Excessive caution by the captain of Lutzow caused him to break off the attack having caused little damage.

Aftermath
The failure of the operation can be attributed to the spirited defence made by the convoy escort and the restrictive and contradictory orders given by Hitler to the force commander. Hitler was furious when he heard about the dismal performance by the navy. Raeder felt unable to continue without the confidence of his leader and offered his resignation, which was accepted. Raeder was replaced by Admiral Karl Dönitz, the commander of the U-boat fleet.

Footnotes

References
 
 
 

Arctic naval operations of World War II
Naval battles and operations of the European theatre of World War II
Military operations of World War II involving Germany
Arctic convoys of World War II